Melioratyvne is an urban-type settlement in Novomoskovsk Raion of Dnipropetrovsk Oblast in Ukraine. It is located a few kilometers east of Novomoskovsk. Melioratyvne belongs to Pishchanka rural hromada, one of the hromadas of Ukraine. Population:

Economy

Transportation
Orlivshchyna railway station, located in Melioratyvne, is on the railway which connects Novomoskovsk and Pavlohrad with further connections to Dnipro, Kharkiv, and Zaporizhia. As of 2020, there is no passenger traffic. The closest station with passenger traffic is Novomoskovsk-Dniprovskyi.

The settlement has access to Highway M04 which connects Dnipro via Pavlohrad with Pokrovsk and to Highway M18 connecting Kharkiv with Zaporizhia and Melitopol.

References

Urban-type settlements in Novomoskovsk Raion